The Star Sailors League (SSL) is the global inshore sailing circuit launched by Olympic athletes in 2012. Supported by the sailing stars like Loïck Peyron and Dennis Conner (SSL honorary chairman), the SSL is recognized as "special event" by World Sailing since 2017. Its main philosophy considers the athletes (not the boats) as the "Stars". Its goals are:
 Showcase the annual global sailing championship with its 15’000 regattas on the example of the Calcio of football in Italy
 Determine and celebrate the world leaders in sailing
 Promote the inshore regattas to the global audience

SSL Circuit

The three main components of the SSL Circuit:
 SSL RANKING: Every Tuesday, the SSL updates and publishes the ranking of the 100,000 leading athletes of the SSL Circuit, thus highlighting the world's top inshore sailors. (The SSL Circuit = 15,000 regattas/year in more than 100 countries)
 SSL FINALS: Every year around November–December, on the model of the yearly play-off in ice-hockey, the SSL organizes the annual final of the SSL Circuit among the 20 best athletes of the ranking, to crown the champion of the season
 SSL GOLD CUP: Every two years, on the model of the football World Cup (or rugby or cricket, etc.), the SSL organizes the "ultimate" championship of the circuit among the 56 first nations of the ranking, to crown the best sailing nation

Rankings
From 2019, a wide range of class race results will be gradually integrated into a weekly world ranking inspired by the ATP tennis ranking. At the end of the season, it will qualify the best in the world for the annual final of the circuit (with prize money), and every two years for the SSL Gold Cup. The SSL Global Ranking does not replace the rankings specific to each class but completes them, to offer a simple and attractive overview of inshore sailing to the general public; the SSL Global Ranking will bring together nearly 100,000 athletes in 2021 and will be used as a communication tool in 2019 to promote athletes and the sailing season.

SSL Global Ranking Method

Reference Tables For Allocation Of Points

Categories Of Events 

a With the exception of MR & all Grand Prix, World + Continental + National Championships with less than 10 boats will be downgraded to the lower category

b Continental: African-Asian-European-Oceania-South/American-North/American-Eastern/Hemisphere-Western/Hemisphere-Championships

c Continental Games: African-Asian-Pacific-Pan American Games

d Grand Prix I: 

e Grand Prix II: Sail GP, TP52 Super Series, RC44 Cup, GC32 Racing Tour, 18 Footers

f Grand Prix III: D35, M32, TF35

Classes

Types Of Competitions 

g Competitions for Olympic or local Games qualification and for Olympic or local Games remain "Open" competitions

h Competitions that add 2 (or more) of particular types (eg Juniors + Girls) get 20% of the points

Time Validity Of Points 
Due to the exceptional situation that occurred for COVID-19, the SSL Management Board decided to change the "Time Validity Points" rule, starting from December 15, 2020, until July 31, 2023.

i For the Olympic Games, for the AC Qualifiers and for the America's Cup, the 50% rule continues until the next edition (not only 156 weeks ago)

Starting from August 1, 2023, the "Time Validity Points" will return to the usual one (see table below):

i For the Olympic Games and for the America's Cup, the 50% rule continues until the next edition (not only 104 weeks ago)

SSL Ranking Points Example: Optimist World Championship - A 4 Step Process

Examples Of SSL Points Allocated to 6 World Championships

Comparison Of SSL Scores Allocated To The 7 Categories Of Regattas

SSL Global Ranking : Principles 

 Fundamental Points
 Origin
 The SSL Global Ranking was conceived and continue to be developed by a group of Olympic and amateur sailors.
 Philosophy
 SSL Global Ranking aims first and foremost to offer the first transversal and global ranking of inshore sailors, in complement to all national or international Class Ranking established by the classes and federations.
 Goals
 The SSL Global Ranking aims to represent a reference and an attractive tool of communication used to:
 Select sailors for the SSL Finals and for the teams in the SSL Gold Cup
 Promote sailors and their skills
 Expand the audience of sailing
 Technical Features
 6 Best Scores
 The SSL Ranking takes in consideration the best 6 scores of each athlete in the last 156 weeks (note: from January 1, 2023, the "Time Validity Points" rules will return to the usual one, i.e. last 104 weeks).
 Exception: All scores allocated for category 7 competitions are added up without any limitation of numbers
 All Rewarded
 All athletes who have participated in one race receive point(s). The winner gets basically from 10 to 4000 points and the last ranked 1 point.
 Weekly Update
 The SSL Global Ranking is updated weekly and published every Tuesday at www.starsailors.com/ranking.
 Filters
 The SSL Global Ranking can be filtered according to 3 criteria:
 By Gender (Men – Women – Open/Global)
 By Class of boats
 By Nation
 Skipper & Crew
  The SSL Global Ranking produces 2 distinct Rankings:
 The SSL "Skipper" Global Ranking
 The SSL "Crew" Global Ranking
 Note: The "Skipper" designation used generically throughout this document refers specifically and only to the "Helmsman".
 Eligibility - Integration - Evolution
 Eligibility: Athletes
 All athletes without any restrictions (age, sex, status) who are on an official regatta ranking and who have finished at least one full race, may appear in the SSL Global Ranking.
 Eligibility: Events
 All events which meet the criteria below can be integrated in the SSL Global Ranking:
 Competition validated by a class recognized by World Sailing or by a National Association
 Competition in real time (= no Ratings & Handicap Systems) with monotype boats or development sailing classes < 30 ff
 Inshore competitions organized for a maximum period of 15 continuous days. (Exceptions: America's Cup and SSL GC)
 Integration Steps
 Weighting based on Event Category, World Sailing classes, open/restricted events:
 Major Events:                                                              (4)                      Olympic Games, America's Cup, SSL Gold Cup & Finals
 Special Events:                                                           (4)                      World Match Racing Tour (MR), ACWS, SailGP, SSL Grand Slams
 Classes with Status 1 / Olympic Classes:                   (8)                     Finn, Laser (M), Laser (W), 49er, 49erFX, 470 (M), 470 (W) Nacra 17
 Classes with Status 2 / WS Classes:                     (~100)                    5O5, Dragon, Hansa 2.3, Etchells, J/70, Melges 24, Moth, TP52, Star, …  
 Classes with Status 3 / Other Classes:                (~5000)                   Sabot, MC Scow, P-Boot, Sea Snark, Folketboot, Optimist, National 10, …  
 Rules & Evolution
 The SSL Global Ranking rules are based on the rules that were used in a DEVELOPMENT PHASE from January 2013 to December 2018. During the development phase, to simplify development of the system only results from a single class were used.
 The SSL Global Ranking will be in a TRANSITION PHASE until December 2021, as dozens of classes and thousands of athletes are added.
 From 1 January 2022 forward, the SSL Global Ranking will be in its OPERATING PHASE. New classes will be added to the system only at the start of a calendar year, i.e. no new classes will be added during 2022.
 SKIPPER / CREW – SCORING FEATURES
 "Skipper/Crew" 
 Rules The helmsman and each crew member from one team are awarded the same number of points.
 All crew members of a team who have participated in one race receive the same number of points for the SSL "Crew" Global Ranking; this rule remains fixed, whatever the number of races sailed by each crew member and whatever the number of crew members having participated.
 Only one helmsman per team and per event may receive points for the SSL "Skipper" Global Ranking.
 An athlete cannot be awarded SSL points in the 2 categories if they have participated as a helmsman and as a crew member in the same event. In this case, only the SSL points which are allocated for their role as a crew member are retained.
 The points awarded in each category ("Skipper" and "Crew" Member) cannot be added together.

SSL Nations Ranking Method

The SSL Nations Ranking takes in consideration:

●      The total points for each Nation are given by the sum of the position in the global ranking of the top 5 skippers + 2 crews.

●      If there is a score tie between two or more Nations, the tie shall be broken in favor of the Nation with its top skipper in the highest position in the Skipper Global Ranking.

The SSL Nations Ranking is updated and published on the 10th of each month.

Statistics

Number one ranked sailors

The following is a list of sailors who have achieved the number one position in the SSL ranking since the inception of the rankings in 2013 for Men and in 2020 for Women:

Year-end number one sailor

Countries with Number one ranked sailors

Number one country in the SSL Nations Ranking

SSL Finals

SSL Finals

Multiple medallists

SSL Grand Slams

SSL Lake Grand Slams

SSL City Grand Slams

SSL Breeze Grand Slams

SSL Gold Cup
First edition in 2022

References

External links
 

2013 establishments in Switzerland
Organisations based in Lausanne
Sports organizations established in 2013
Sailing associations
Star (keelboat) competitions
World Sailing Special Events
Sailing series